Natural holmium (67Ho) contains one observationally stable isotope, 165Ho. The below table lists 36 isotopes spanning 140Ho through 175Ho as well as 33 nuclear isomers. Among the known synthetic radioactive isotopes; the most stable one is 163Ho, with a half-life of 4,570 years. All other radioisotopes have half-lives not greater than 1.117 days in their ground states (although the metastable 166m1Ho has a half-life of about 1,200 years), and most have half-lives under 3 hours.

List of isotopes 

|-
| 140Ho
| style="text-align:right" | 67
| style="text-align:right" | 73
| 139.96854(54)#
| 6(3) ms
|
|
| 8+#
| 
| 
|-
| 141Ho
| style="text-align:right" | 67
| style="text-align:right" | 74
| 140.96310(54)#
| 4.1(3) ms
|
|
| (7/2−)
| 
| 
|-
| style="text-indent:1em" | 141mHo
| colspan="3" style="text-indent:2em" | 66(2) keV
| 6.4(8) µs
|
|
| (1/2+)
|
|
|-
| rowspan=2|142Ho
| rowspan=2 style="text-align:right" | 67
| rowspan=2 style="text-align:right" | 75
| rowspan=2|141.95977(54)#
| rowspan=2|400(100) ms
| β+
| 142Dy
| rowspan=2|(6 to 9)
| rowspan=2|
| rowspan=2|
|-
| p
| 141Dy
|- 
| 143Ho
| style="text-align:right" | 67
| style="text-align:right" | 76
| 142.95461(43)#
| 300# ms[>200 ns]
| β+
| 143Dy
| 11/2−#
|
|
|-
| rowspan=2|144Ho
| rowspan=2 style="text-align:right" | 67
| rowspan=2 style="text-align:right" | 77
| rowspan=2|143.95148(32)#
| rowspan=2|0.7(1) s
| β+
| 144Dy
| rowspan=2|
| rowspan=2|
| rowspan=2|
|-
| β+, p
| 143Tb
|-
| 145Ho
| style="text-align:right" | 67
| style="text-align:right" | 78
| 144.94720(32)#
| 2.4(1) s
| β+
| 145Dy
| (11/2−)
|
|
|-
| style="text-indent:1em" | 145mHo
| colspan="3" style="text-indent:2em" | 100(100)# keV
| 100# ms
|
|
| 5/2+#
|
|
|-
| rowspan=2|146Ho
| rowspan=2 style="text-align:right" | 67
| rowspan=2 style="text-align:right" | 79
| rowspan=2|145.94464(21)#
| rowspan=2|3.6(3) s
| β+
| 146Dy
| rowspan=2|(10+)
| rowspan=2|
| rowspan=2|
|-
| β+, p (rare)
| 145Tb
|-
| rowspan=2|147Ho
| rowspan=2 style="text-align:right" | 67
| rowspan=2 style="text-align:right" | 80
| rowspan=2|146.94006(3)
| rowspan=2|5.8(4) s
| β+
| 147Dy
| rowspan=2|(11/2−)
| rowspan=2|
| rowspan=2|
|-
| β+, p (rare)
| 146Tb
|-
| 148Ho
| style="text-align:right" | 67
| style="text-align:right" | 81
| 147.93772(14)
| 2.2(11) s
| β+
| 148Dy
| (1+)
| 
| 
|-
| rowspan=2 style="text-indent:1em" | 148m1Ho
| rowspan=2 colspan="3" style="text-indent:2em" | 400(100)# keV
| rowspan=2|9.49(12) s
| β+ (99.92%)
| 148Dy
| rowspan=2|(6)−
| rowspan=2|
| rowspan=2|
|-
| β+, p (.08%)
| 147Tb
|-
| style="text-indent:1em" | 148m2Ho
| colspan="3" style="text-indent:2em" | 690(100)# keV
| 2.35(4) ms
|
|
| (10+)
|
|
|-
| 149Ho
| style="text-align:right" | 67
| style="text-align:right" | 82
| 148.933775(20)
| 21.1(2) s
| β+
| 149Dy
| (11/2−)
|
|
|-
| style="text-indent:1em" | 149m1Ho
| colspan="3" style="text-indent:2em" | 48.80(20) keV
| 56(3) s
| β+
| 149Dy
| (1/2+)
|
|
|-
| style="text-indent:1em" | 149m2Ho
| colspan="3" style="text-indent:2em" | 7200(350) keV
| >=100 ns
|
|
|
|
|
|-
| 150Ho
| style="text-align:right" | 67
| style="text-align:right" | 83
| 149.933496(15)
| 76.8(18) s
| β+
| 150Dy
| 2−
|
|
|-
| style="text-indent:1em" | 150m1Ho
| colspan="3" style="text-indent:2em" | −10(50) keV
| 23.3(3) s
| β+
| 150Dy
| (9)+
|
|
|-
| style="text-indent:1em" | 150m2Ho
| colspan="3" style="text-indent:2em" | ~8000 keV
| 751 ns
|
|
|
|
|
|-
| rowspan=2|151Ho
| rowspan=2 style="text-align:right" | 67
| rowspan=2 style="text-align:right" | 84
| rowspan=2|150.931688(13)
| rowspan=2|35.2(1) s
| β+ (78%)
| 151Dy
| rowspan=2|11/2(−)
| rowspan=2|
| rowspan=2|
|-
| α (22%)
| 147Tb
|-
| rowspan=2 style="text-indent:1em" | 151mHo
| rowspan=2 colspan="3" style="text-indent:2em" | 41.0(2) keV
| rowspan=2|47.2(10) s
| α (77%)
| 147Tb
| rowspan=2|1/2(+)
| rowspan=2|
| rowspan=2|
|-
| β+ (22%)
| 151Dy
|-
| rowspan=2|152Ho
| rowspan=2 style="text-align:right" | 67
| rowspan=2 style="text-align:right" | 85
| rowspan=2|151.931714(15)
| rowspan=2|161.8(3) s
| β+ (88%)
| 152Dy
| rowspan=2|2−
| rowspan=2|
| rowspan=2|
|-
| α (12%)
| 148Tb
|-
| style="text-indent:1em" | 152m1Ho
| colspan="3" style="text-indent:2em" | 160(1) keV
| 50.0(4) s
|
|
| 9+
|
|
|-
| style="text-indent:1em" | 152m2Ho
| colspan="3" style="text-indent:2em" | 3019.59(19) keV
| 8.4(3) µs
|
|
| 19−
|
|
|-
| rowspan=2|153Ho
| rowspan=2 style="text-align:right" | 67
| rowspan=2 style="text-align:right" | 86
| rowspan=2|152.930199(6)
| rowspan=2|2.01(3) min
| β+ (99.94%)
| 153Dy
| rowspan=2|11/2−
| rowspan=2|
| rowspan=2|
|-
| α (.05%)
| 149Tb
|-
| rowspan=2 style="text-indent:1em" | 153m1Ho
| rowspan=2 colspan="3" style="text-indent:2em" | 68.7(3) keV
| rowspan=2|9.3(5) min
| β+ (99.82%)
| 153Dy
| rowspan=2|1/2+
| rowspan=2|
| rowspan=2|
|-
| α (.18%)
| 149Tb
|-
| style="text-indent:1em" | 153m2Ho
| colspan="3" style="text-indent:2em" | 2772 keV
| 229(2) ns
|
|
| (31/2+)
|
|
|-
| rowspan=2|154Ho
| rowspan=2 style="text-align:right" | 67
| rowspan=2 style="text-align:right" | 87
| rowspan=2|153.930602(9)
| rowspan=2|11.76(19) min
| β+ (99.98%)
| 154Dy
| rowspan=2|2−
| rowspan=2|
| rowspan=2|
|-
| α (.02%)
| 150Tb
|-
| rowspan=3 style="text-indent:1em" | 154mHo
| rowspan=3 colspan="3" style="text-indent:2em" | 238(30) keV
| rowspan=3|3.10(14) min
| β+ (99.99%)
| 154Dy
| rowspan=3|8+
| rowspan=3|
| rowspan=3|
|-
| α (.001%)
| 150Tb
|-
| IT (rare)
| 154Ho
|-
| 155Ho
| style="text-align:right" | 67
| style="text-align:right" | 88
| 154.929103(19)
| 48(1) min
| β+
| 155Dy
| 5/2+
|
|
|-
| style="text-indent:1em" | 155mHo
| colspan="3" style="text-indent:2em" | 141.97(11) keV
| 880(80) µs
|
|
| 11/2−
|
|
|-
| 156Ho
| style="text-align:right" | 67
| style="text-align:right" | 89
| 155.92984(5)
| 56(1) min
| β+
| 156Dy
| 4−
|
|
|-
| rowspan=2 style="text-indent:1em" | 156m1Ho
| rowspan=2 colspan="3" style="text-indent:2em" | 100(50)# keV
| rowspan=2|7.8(3) min
| β+
| 156Dy
| rowspan=2|(9+)
| rowspan=2| 
| rowspan=2|
|-
| IT
| 156Ho
|-
| style="text-indent:1em" | 156m2Ho
| colspan="3" style="text-indent:2em" | 52.4(5) keV
| 9.5(15) s
|
|
| 1−
|
|
|-
| 157Ho
| style="text-align:right" | 67
| style="text-align:right" | 90
| 156.928256(26)
| 12.6(2) min
| β+
| 157Dy
| 7/2−
|
|
|-
| rowspan=2|158Ho
| rowspan=2 style="text-align:right" | 67
| rowspan=2 style="text-align:right" | 91
| rowspan=2|157.928941(29)
| rowspan=2|11.3(4) min
| β+ (93%)
| 158Dy
| rowspan=2|5+
| rowspan=2|
| rowspan=2|
|-
| α (7%)
| 154Tb
|-
| rowspan=2 style="text-indent:1em" | 158m1Ho
| rowspan=2 colspan="3" style="text-indent:2em" | 67.200(10) keV
| rowspan=2|28(2) min
| IT (81%)
| 158Ho
| rowspan=2|2−
| rowspan=2|
| rowspan=2|
|-
| β+ (19%)
| 158Dy
|-
| style="text-indent:1em" | 158m2Ho
| colspan="3" style="text-indent:2em" | 180(70)# keV
| 21.3(23) min
|
|
| (9+)
|
|
|-
| 159Ho
| style="text-align:right" | 67
| style="text-align:right" | 92
| 158.927712(4)
| 33.05(11) min
| β+
| 159Dy
| 7/2−
|
|
|-
| style="text-indent:1em" | 159mHo
| colspan="3" style="text-indent:2em" | 205.91(5) keV
| 8.30(8) s
| IT
| 159Ho
| 1/2+
|
|
|-
| 160Ho
| style="text-align:right" | 67
| style="text-align:right" | 93
| 159.928729(16)
| 25.6(3) min
| β+
| 160Dy
| 5+
|
|
|-
| rowspan=2 style="text-indent:1em" | 160m1Ho
| rowspan=2 colspan="3" style="text-indent:2em" | 59.98(3) keV
| rowspan=2|5.02(5) h
| IT (65%)
| 160Ho
| rowspan=2|2−
| rowspan=2|
| rowspan=2|
|-
| β+ (35%)
| 160Dy
|-
| style="text-indent:1em" | 160m2Ho
| colspan="3" style="text-indent:2em" | 197(16) keV
| 3 s
|
|
| (9+)
|
|
|-
| 161Ho
| style="text-align:right" | 67
| style="text-align:right" | 94
| 160.927855(3)
| 2.48(5) h
| EC
| 161Dy
| 7/2−
|
|
|-
| style="text-indent:1em" | 161mHo
| colspan="3" style="text-indent:2em" | 211.16(3) keV
| 6.76(7) s
| IT
| 161Ho
| 1/2+
|
|
|-
| 162Ho
| style="text-align:right" | 67
| style="text-align:right" | 95
| 161.929096(4)
| 15.0(10) min
| β+
| 162Dy
| 1+
|
|
|-
| rowspan=2 style="text-indent:1em" | 162mHo
| rowspan=2 colspan="3" style="text-indent:2em" | 106(7) keV
| rowspan=2|67.0(7) min
| IT (62%)
| 162Ho
| rowspan=2|6−
| rowspan=2|
| rowspan=2|
|-
| β+ (38%)
| 162Dy
|-
| 163Ho
| style="text-align:right" | 67
| style="text-align:right" | 96
| 162.9287339(27)
| 4570(25) y
| EC
| 163Dy
| 7/2−
|
|
|-
| style="text-indent:1em" | 163mHo
| colspan="3" style="text-indent:2em" | 297.88(7) keV
| 1.09(3) s
| IT
| 163Ho
| 1/2+
|
|
|-
| rowspan=2|164Ho
| rowspan=2 style="text-align:right" | 67
| rowspan=2 style="text-align:right" | 97
| rowspan=2|163.9302335(30)
| rowspan=2|29(1) min
| EC (60%)
| 164Dy
| rowspan=2|1+
| rowspan=2|
| rowspan=2|
|-
| β− (40%)
| 164Er
|-
| style="text-indent:1em" | 164mHo
| colspan="3" style="text-indent:2em" | 139.77(8) keV
| 38.0(10) min[37.5(+15−5) min]
| IT
| 164Ho
| 6−
|
|
|-
| 165Ho
| style="text-align:right" | 67
| style="text-align:right" | 98
| 164.9303221(27)
| colspan=3 align=center|Observationally Stable
| 7/2−
| 1.0000
|
|-
| 166Ho
| style="text-align:right" | 67
| style="text-align:right" | 99
| 165.9322842(27)
| 26.83(2) h
| β−
| 166Er
| 0−
|
|
|-
| style="text-indent:1em" | 166m1Ho
| colspan="3" style="text-indent:2em" | 5.985(18) keV
| 1200(180) y
| β−
| 166Er
| (7)−
|
|
|-
| style="text-indent:1em" | 166m2Ho
| colspan="3" style="text-indent:2em" | 190.9052(20) keV
| 185(15) µs
|
|
| 3+
|
|
|-
| 167Ho
| style="text-align:right" | 67
| style="text-align:right" | 100
| 166.933133(6)
| 3.003(18) h
| β−
| 167Er
| 7/2−
|
|
|-
| style="text-indent:1em" | 167mHo
| colspan="3" style="text-indent:2em" | 259.34(11) keV
| 6.0(10) µs
|
|
| 3/2+
|
|
|-
| 168Ho
| style="text-align:right" | 67
| style="text-align:right" | 101
| 167.93552(3)
| 2.99(7) min
| β−
| 168Er
| 3+
|
|
|-
| rowspan=2 style="text-indent:1em" | 168m1Ho
| rowspan=2 colspan="3" style="text-indent:2em" | 59(1) keV
| rowspan=2|132(4) s
| IT (99.5%)
| 168Ho
| rowspan=2|(6+)
| rowspan=2|
| rowspan=2|
|-
| β− (.5%)
| 168Er
|-
| style="text-indent:1em" | 168m2Ho
| colspan="3" style="text-indent:2em" | 143.4(2) keV
| >4 µs
|
|
| (1)−
|
|
|-
| style="text-indent:1em" | 168m3Ho
| colspan="3" style="text-indent:2em" | 192.6(2) keV
| 108(11) ns
|
|
| 1+
|
|
|-
| 169Ho
| style="text-align:right" | 67
| style="text-align:right" | 102
| 168.936872(22)
| 4.72(10) min
| β−
| 169Er
| 7/2−
|
|
|-
| 170Ho
| style="text-align:right" | 67
| style="text-align:right" | 103
| 169.93962(5)
| 2.76(5) min
| β−
| 170Er
| 6+#
|
|
|-
| style="text-indent:1em" | 170mHo
| colspan="3" style="text-indent:2em" | 120(70) keV
| 43(2) s
| β−
| 170Er
| (1+)
|
|
|-
| 171Ho
| style="text-align:right" | 67
| style="text-align:right" | 104
| 170.94147(64)
| 53(2) s
| β−
| 171Er
| 7/2−#
|
|
|-
| 172Ho
| style="text-align:right" | 67
| style="text-align:right" | 105
| 171.94482(43)#
| 25(3) s
| β−
| 172Er
|
|
|
|-
| 173Ho
| style="text-align:right" | 67
| style="text-align:right" | 106
| 172.94729(43)#
| 10# s
| β−
| 173Er
| 7/2−#
|
|
|-
| 174Ho
| style="text-align:right" | 67
| style="text-align:right" | 107
| 173.95115(54)#
| 8# s
|
|
|
|
|
|-
| 175Ho
| style="text-align:right" | 67
| style="text-align:right" | 108
| 174.95405(64)#
| 5# s
|
|
| 7/2−#
|
|

References 

 Isotope masses from:

 Isotopic compositions and standard atomic masses from:
 

 Half-life, spin, and isomer data selected from the following sources.

 
Holmium
Holmium